1637 Swings, provisional designation , is a dark asteroid from the outer region of the asteroid belt, approximately 50 kilometers in diameter. Discovered by Joseph Hunaerts in 1936, it was named after Belgian astronomer Pol Swings.

Discovery 

Swings was discovered on 28 August 1936, by Belgian astronomer Joseph Hunaerts at the Royal Observatory of Belgium in Uccle, Belgium. In the following month, it was independently discovered by astronomer Cyril Jackson at Johannesburg Observatory in South Africa.

Orbit and classification 

The asteroid orbits the Sun in the outer main-belt at a distance of 2.9–3.2 AU once every 5 years and 5 months (1,967 days). Its orbit has an eccentricity of 0.04 and an inclination of 14° with respect to the ecliptic. However, the body's observation arc begins with its official discovery observation at Uccle in 1936.

Physical characteristics 

According to the surveys carried out by the Infrared Astronomical Satellite IRAS and NASA's Wide-field Infrared Survey Explorer with its subsequent NEOWISE mission, Swings surface has an albedo of 0.042, and measures 45.15 and 52.99 kilometers in diameter, respectively. It has an absolute magnitude of 10.4.

As of 2017, the body's spectral type, rotation period and shape remain unknown.

Naming 

This minor planet was named after Pol Swings (1906–1983), a Belgian astrophysicist, astronomer and president of the International Astronomical Union during 1964–1967, who significantly contributed to the understanding of the physics of comets and their spectra. The official  was published by the Minor Planet Center on 20 February 1976.

References

External links 
 Asteroid Lightcurve Database (LCDB), query form (info )
 Dictionary of Minor Planet Names, Google books
 Asteroids and comets rotation curves, CdR – Observatoire de Genève, Raoul Behrend
 Discovery Circumstances: Numbered Minor Planets (1)-(5000) – Minor Planet Center
 
 

001637
Discoveries by Joseph Hunaerts
Named minor planets
19360828